This is a list of collections and treasuries of the popular comic strip Pearls Before Swine by Stephan Pastis.

Collections

Treasuries
Treasuries contain two books in one binding with Sunday strips in color, plus insight from Stephan Pastis. Starting with The Crass Menagerie, the covers feature live-action Stephan Pastis and backgrounds, with the comic's characters (in their usual drawn appearance) added in. While the shorter collections stopped after Floundering Fathers, the treasuries are still ongoing.

Gift books

AMP! books

Pearls Before Swine